The men's 400 metres hurdles event at the 1967 Pan American Games was held in Winnipeg on 30 July and 1 August.

Medalists

Results

Heats

Final

References

Athletics at the 1967 Pan American Games
1967